Anthony Newlands (31 January 1925, London – 6 October 1995), was a British actor, born Raymond Gordon Newland.

His parents were Lilian Elizabeth (née Manning) and Frederick Stanley. Newland had two sisters: Jean Lillian Newland (born 24 January 1932) and Marion Frances Newland (born 24 July 1935).

Newland was obliged to use Newlands as a stage name as there was another Anthony Newland acting at the time. He was best known for his supporting guest roles in British television series of the 1960s, including two roles in ABC Weekend's adventure drama The Avengers and a role in the ITC Entertainment series Danger Man. He also appeared in several television dramas and big screen films, including Cannon's Mata Hari (1985). He also played the President of the Court on Crimes of Passion from 1970 to 1973.

Filmography

References

External links
 

English male television actors
English male film actors
1925 births
1995 deaths
20th-century English male actors